Adelotremus deloachi, the spotfin fangblenny, is a species of combtooth blenny from the western Pacific Ocean in Indonesia. The type and paratypes were collected from Bali and the Lembeh Strait. The specific name honours Ned Deloach, an author and photographer who has written about reef fishes and raised awareness of their conservation.

References

deloachi
Fish described in 2017